Presidential elections were held in Cyprus on 17 February 2008, with a second round on 24 February. The second-round winner, and thus the President of Cyprus for the next term, was Dimitris Christofias.

The first round saw a close result between three leading candidates, Dimitris Christofias of AKEL, Ioannis Kasoulidis of Democratic Rally, and the incumbent Tassos Papadopoulos. Results showed Kasoulidis in first place with 33.51%, Christofias in second with 33.29%, and Papadopoulos in third with 31.79%. Christophias and Kasoulidis therefore participated in a second round on February 24. The elimination of Papadopoulos in the first round was viewed as surprising.

In the second round, Christofias won with 53.37% against 46.63% for Kasoulides. He was sworn in as President on February 28.

According to the exit polls, Papadopoulos was voted for by 40% of "No" voters in the Annan referendum and 5% of the "Yes", Christofias by 35% of the "No" and 34% of the "Yes" voters and Kasoulidis by the 24% of the "No" and 62% of the "Yes" voters.

Candidates
Papadopoulos (DIKO) announced in late July that he would run for re-election. In early July 2007, the ruling coalition (consisting of DIKO, AKEL and EDEK) fell apart due to a lack of consensus on a common candidate for the presidential elections; AKEL general secretary Dimitris Christofias was proposed as a common candidate by AKEL, but rejected by DIKO and EDEK (who both will support Papadopoulos' bid for reelection), which AKEL took as a reason to leave the ruling coalition. Thus, both Papadopoulos and Christophias contested the election. The Ecological and Environmental Movement (KOP) decided on November 18, 2007 to support Papadopoulos. The movement supported him in 2003 as well.

Furthermore, the Democratic Rally support MEP Ioannis Kasoulidis, a former foreign minister, and Kostas Themistokleous, a former minister of agriculture and environment, also contested the election.

Controversial MEP Marios Matsakis announced on 29 December 2007 that he would contest the election. Marios Matsakis was elected two times as a member of the Cypriot parliament and once as member of the Εuropean Parliament with the support of DIKO.

The Secretariat of the Movement of the United Democrats initially considered to support Themistokleous but at the end they supported Christophias to minimize the possibility of Papadopoulos' re-election.

Nine candidates were eventually approved to participate in the elections. Each candidate had to be recommended by one Cypriot citizen and supported by eight more.

The names of the candidates announced on 18 January 2008 were:
Tassos Papadopoulos, supported by DIKO, EDEK, Evroko, ADIK, KOP
Dimitris Christofias, supported by AKEL, United Democrats
Ioannis Kasoulidis, supported by DISY, Kinima Eleftheron Politon, Evropaiki Dimokratia, Laiko Sosialistiko Kinima
Kostas Themistokleous
Marios Matsakis
Andreas Efstratiou
Anastasis Michael
Christodoulos Neophytou
Kostas Kyriacou (Outopos)

Campaign

Second round
After the first round of the election and the elimination of Papadopoulos, the latter's party, DIKO, announced its support for Christofias although Papadopoulos himself stayed neutral. Christofias had offered three ministerial positions to DIKO, including that of Minister of Foreign Affairs, in addition to the post of President of the House of Representatives, while Kasoulides had offered five ministerial positions in exchange for DIKO's support. EDEK also backed Christofias, on the proposal of its Political Bureau, with 109 members of its Central Committee voting in favor of supporting Christofias, five voting against, and two abstaining. The Cypriot Orthodox Church leader Archbishop Chrysostomos II backed Kasoulidis.

Ecological and Environmental Movement on 21 February 2008 decided to support Dimitris Christofias.

Evroko, ADIK and Marios Matsakis announced that they will support neither of the two candidates.

Kostas Themistokleous backed Ioannis Kasoulidis.

Debates
On 26 January 2008 the three main candidates, Papadopoulos, Christofias, and Kasoulidis, debated on television. The debate was transmitted by all Cypriot TV stations. The three candidates were questioned by journalists from  RIK, MEGA, ANT1, Sigma TV and CNC Plus TV. The debate started at 9.45PM local time and lasted 1 hour and 50 minutes. Each candidate had three minutes to answer each question and 1.5 minute for every follow-up question. The procedure was divided in 6 sections and, at the end of each section, each candidate had 3 minutes to give a short speech and 1.5 minute for a short comment.

On 14 February, a second debate was held. The subject of discussion was the Cyprus dispute.

Opinion polls
A collection of opinion polls taken before the elections is listed below. Beginning on 11 February 2008, no opinion poll is allowed to be published.

Results

Geographical distribution

References

External links
 Official Results, Republic of Cyprus, Ministry of the Interior
 Press and Information Office, Republic of Cyprus
 public Issue Observatory
 Cyprus Elections & Politics
 KyproEkloges.com Cyprus 2008 Presidential Election
 Cyprus 2008 Presidential Election Blog

Presidential elections in Cyprus
Presidential
Cyprus
Cyprus